Kinangop Constituency is an electoral constituency in Kenya. It is one of five constituencies in Nyandarua County. The constituency has five wards, all of which elect Members of County Assembly (MCA's) for the Nyandarua County. The constituency was established for the 1988 elections.

See the constituency website for more information:- www.kinangopconstituency.com

It is not to be confused with Kinango Constituency located in Kwale County.

Main ethnic group: Kikukyu

Main economic activity: Agriculture (Dairy and crop farming)

Main crops: Irish potatoes, Cabbages, Carrots, Fruits, Kales, Wheat, Barley

Main dairy companies: KCC, Tuzo, Brookside, Kinangop dairies and other small dairy companies

Members of Parliament

Wards

References

External links 

Constituencies in Nyandarua County
Constituencies in Central Province (Kenya)
1988 establishments in Kenya
Constituencies established in 1988